Lim Chee Wei (born 16 January 1991) is a Malaysian male karateka competing in the Kata division. He won the gold medal in the individual kata event at the 2014 Asian Games.

References

1991 births
Living people
People from Penang
Malaysian sportspeople of Chinese descent
Malaysian male karateka
Asian Games medalists in karate
Karateka at the 2014 Asian Games
Karateka at the 2018 Asian Games
Asian Games gold medalists for Malaysia
Medalists at the 2014 Asian Games
Southeast Asian Games gold medalists for Malaysia
Southeast Asian Games bronze medalists for Malaysia
Southeast Asian Games medalists in karate
Competitors at the 2011 Southeast Asian Games
Competitors at the 2013 Southeast Asian Games
Competitors at the 2017 Southeast Asian Games
21st-century Malaysian people